The March 76S is a Group 6 prototype race car, designed, developed and built by British manufacturer March Engineering, for sports car racing, in 1976.

References

Sports prototypes